Nurul Huda Abdullah, also known as Ch'ng Su-Lin,  (born 31 July 1972) is a former Malaysian competitive swimmer.

She holds the record of the most number of gold medals won at the Southeast Asian Games (SEA Games) for a Malaysian athlete, having won a total of 22 gold medals in the swimming events at three SEA Games (from 1985 to 1989). 

She was the first Malaysian swimmer to win a medal at the Asian Games and remains the only Malaysian female swimmer to have won medals at the Asian Games and Asian Swimming Championships, with a total of 2 silver and 2 bronze medals at the 10th Asian Games 1986 Seoul, and a total of 2 silver and 1 bronze medal at the 3rd Asian Swimming Championship (1988) in Guangzhou. 

She participated in the swimming events at the 1988 Summer Olympic Games in Seoul, Korea. 

As a result of her swimming achievements, she was the first Malaysian to be awarded an IOC Trophy from the International Olympic Committee in 1987, and was inducted into the Olympic Council of Malaysia (OCM) Hall of Fame in 2004. She was awarded the Malaysian Sportswoman of the Year for five consecutive years from 1985 to 1989.

She was the Deputy Chef-de-Mission for the Malaysian Contingent to the 30th SEA Games (2019) in Philippines.

Swimming career

12th SEA Games Singapore (1983) 

 Competed in 2 swimming events - 400m individual medley (ranked 4th), and 800m freestyle (ranked 8th)

13th SEA Games Bangkok (1985)

 Won 7 gold, 1 silver & 1 bronze out 9 events competed
 Broke 6 SEA Games records
 100m freestyle (gold), 200m freestyle (gold), 400m freestyle (gold), 800m freestyle (gold), 200m butterfly (gold), 200m individual medley (gold), 400m individual medley (gold)
 100m butterfly (silver)
 4x100m freestyle relay (bronze)

13th Commonwealth Games Edinburgh (1986)

 Did not compete as Malaysia boycotted the Games

10th Asian Games Seoul (1986)

 Won 2 silver & 2 bronze medals out of 4 events competed
 400m freestyle (silver), 800m freestyle (silver)
 200m freestyle (bronze), 400m individual medley (bronze)

14th SEA Games Jakarta (1987)

 Won 7 gold & 1 silver out of 8 events competed
 100m freestyle (gold), 200m freestyle (gold), 400m freestyle (gold), 800m freestyle (gold), 100m butterfly (gold), 200m butterfly (gold), 400m individual medley (gold)
 200m individual medley (silver)

3rd Asian Swimming Championships Guangzhou (1988)

 Won 2 silver & 1 bronze out of 3 events competed
400m freestyle (silver), 800m freestyle (silver)
  200m freestyle (bronze)

XXIVth Summer Olympic Games Seoul (1988)

 Competed in 3 swimming events - 800m freestyle (ranked 19th), 400m freestyle (ranked 23rd), and 200m freestyle (ranked 27th)

15th SEA Games Kuala Lumpur (1989)

 Won 8 gold & 2 silver out of 10 events competed
 200m freestyle (gold), 400m freestyle (gold), 800m freestyle (gold), 200m butterfly (gold), 200m backstroke (gold), 200m individual medley (gold), 400m individual medley (gold), 4x100m medley relay (gold)
 100m freestyle (silver), 100m butterfly (silver)

11th Asian Games Beijing (1990) 

 Competed in swimming events

Other sporting achievements and accolades 

Malaysian athlete with the most number of gold medals at the Southeast Asian Games (SEA Games)
First Malaysian to win medals in the swimming events at the Asian Games
The only Malaysian female swimmer to have won medals at the Asian Games and Asian Swimming Championships
Winner of the Malaysian Sportswoman of the Year in 1985, 1986, 1987, 1988, 1989
 Winner of the IOC Trophy for Women in Sport (in 1987) and the first Malaysian to have won this trophy
 First female swimmer in Southeast Asia to break the 5 minute mark for the 400 m individual medley
 First female swimmer in Southeast Asia to break the 60 seconds mark for the 100 m freestyle
 Held Malaysian Open records in swimming in 10 individual events out of 12 during her swimming career
 Had faster times than the Malaysian Open records for men in 2 events during her swimming career

Personal life
Nurul is the grand-daughter of the 4th President of Singapore, Dr. Wee Kim Wee.

Honour

Honour of Malaysia 
  :
  Member of the Order of the Defender of the Realm (AMN) (1989)

Notes

References

Malaysian female freestyle swimmers
1972 births
Olympic swimmers of Malaysia
Asian Games medalists in swimming
Living people
Asian Games silver medalists for Malaysia
Asian Games bronze medalists for Malaysia
Swimmers at the 1986 Asian Games
Medalists at the 1986 Asian Games
Southeast Asian Games medalists in swimming
Southeast Asian Games gold medalists for Malaysia
Southeast Asian Games silver medalists for Malaysia
Southeast Asian Games bronze medalists for Malaysia
Members of the Order of the Defender of the Realm
Competitors at the 1985 Southeast Asian Games
Competitors at the 1987 Southeast Asian Games
Competitors at the 1989 Southeast Asian Games
Swimmers at the 1988 Summer Olympics
Malaysian female backstroke swimmers
Malaysian female butterfly swimmers
Malaysian female medley swimmers